Tilford Cinema Corporation, also known as Tilford Cinema Studios, was a film studio business headquartered in New York City with film operations and studio activity in Miami, Florida. It was a pioneer in the studio for hire contracting system. The business was established in 1920 and was led by Walter Ford Tilford and Thomas W. Switzler.

An ad for its services ran in a 1921 edition of Wid's Yearbook. The business was run by Walter Ford (W. F.) Tilford.

Sets and studio space for filming The Purple Highway were provided by Tilford.

In 1922, Tilford bought out Gotham Pictures.

Wiard Boppo Ihnen became part owner and secretary of the film company.

Tilford used Miami Studios buildings.

The company ran short of financing despite optimism after the three films shot at the Miami studio in 1924 becoming moneymakers. It folded and made no more films.

Filmography
Slim Shoulders (1922)
Destiny's Isle (1922)
Another Scandal (1924), based on the Cosmo Hamilton novel
Miami (1924)Ramshackle House'' (1924)

References

American film studios
1920 establishments in New York City
Companies based in Miami
American companies established in 1920